Alexandra Ruth Shipp is an American actress and singer who rose to prominence for portraying singer Aaliyah in the Lifetime television film Aaliyah: The Princess of R&B (2014) and Kimberly Woodruff in the Oscar-nominated film Straight Outta Compton (2015).

Shipp is best known for playing Storm in the X-Men franchise, starting with X-Men: Apocalypse, Abby Suso in the 2018 romantic comedy Love, Simon, and Susan Wilson in musical drama tick, tick... BOOM!.

Early life and education
Shipp was born in Phoenix, Arizona. Her mother is a Kundalini yoga teacher, and her father is a musician. Her father is black and her mother is white. She has two brothers, James and Jordan, and a stepsister, Kasia. Shipp was educated at Squaw Peak Elementary School, Arizona School for the Arts, and St. Mary's Catholic High School in Phoenix. She moved to Los Angeles at the age of 17 to pursue an acting career.

Career
In 2009, Shipp made her acting debut with a minor role in Alvin and the Chipmunks: The Squeakquel. She went on to star in the third season of Nickelodeon's mystery teen drama series House of Anubis, playing the role of KT Rush.

In 2014, Shipp gained attention for her roles as Dani Raymond in the VH1 television film sequel Drumline: A New Beat and Aaliyah Haughton, the title role, in the Lifetime television film Aaliyah: The Princess of R&B. For the latter performance, Shipp also sang. She next portrayed Ice Cube's wife, Kimberly Woodruff, in the biographical drama film Straight Outta Compton, which chronicled the careers of hip hop group N.W.A. In 2016, she co-starred in Bryan Singer's superhero film X-Men: Apocalypse as Ororo Munroe/Storm, a weather-controlling mutant previously portrayed by Halle Berry. In 2018, she starred alongside Nick Robinson and Jorge Lendeborg Jr. in Love, Simon and Kathryn Prescott and Lucy Hale in Dude, both high school comedy films.

She reprised the role of Ororo Munroe / Storm in the 2019 film Dark Phoenix, and, the same summer, also starred  as Sasha Arias in the Shaft sequel.
In 2021 she starred in the film adaptation of tick, tick... BOOM! as Susan.

Shipp is set to star in Greta Gerwig’s Barbie. It is scheduled for release on July 21, 2023.

Personal life
Shipp publicly came out as a member of the LGBT community in June 2021, though she did not specify a label.

Filmography

Film

Television

Video games

Music videos

Discography

Singles

Promotional singles

Music videos

Awards and nominations

References

External links

 

21st-century American actresses
Actresses from Phoenix, Arizona
African-American actresses
American child actresses
American film actresses
American television actresses
Living people
LGBT actresses
LGBT African Americans
LGBT people from Arizona
21st-century African-American women
21st-century African-American people
21st-century American LGBT people
Year of birth missing (living people)